Naqdali-ye Sofla (also Romanized as Naqd‘alī-ye Soflá; also known as Naqd‘alī-ye Pā’īn) is a village in Qaleh Hamam Rural District, Salehabad County, Razavi Khorasan Province, Iran. At the 2006 census, its population was 401, in 90 families.

References 

Populated places in   Torbat-e Jam County